Chalcorana macrops is a species of "true frog" in the family Ranidae. It is endemic to Sulawesi, Indonesia. Common name Masarang frog has been coined for it. The specific name  refers to the large eyes of this frog.

Description
Chalcorana macrops grows to at least  in snout–vent length. The eyes are very large. The head is rather large with a rounded snout. The tympanum is distinct. The fingers are rather and long slender and have well-developed discs. The toes are two-thirds webbed and have discs that are somewhat smaller than the finger discs. Skin is smooth or with a few small warts dorsally. Dorsal colouration is olive-brown. The sides are greyish and marbled with dark brown. Males have an internal vocal sac.

Habitat and conservation
It is threatened by habitat loss caused by smallholder farming. Also water pollution from agriculture is a threat. Some of its habitat is protected by the Lore Lindu National Park.

References

macrops
Amphibians of Sulawesi
Endemic fauna of Indonesia
Amphibians described in 1897
Taxa named by George Albert Boulenger